USS Gallup has been the name of more than one United States Navy ship, and may refer to:

 , ex-Annie E. Gallup, a minesweeper commissioned in 1917 and wrecked in 1918
 , a patrol frigate in commission from 1944 to 1945 and from 1950 to 1951
 , a gunboat in commission from 1966 to 1977

United States Navy ship names
Gallup, New Mexico